Vacha, a Vedic goddess is a personified form of speech. She enters into the inspired poets and visionaries, gives expression and energy to those she loves; she is called the "mother of the Vedas" and consort of Prajapati, the Vedic embodiment of mind. She is also associated with Indra in Aitareya Aranyaka. Elsewhere, such as in the Padma Purana, she is stated to be the wife of Vision (Kashyapa), the mother of Emotions, and the friend of Musicians (Gandharva).

She is identified with goddess Sarasvati in later Vedic literature and post-Vedic texts of Hindu traditions. Sarasvati has remained a significant and revered deity in Hinduism.

See also
Hindu deities
Rigvedic deities
Śabda

References

Further reading
Dictionary of Hindu Lore and Legend by Anna Dhallapiccola
Hindu Goddesses: Vision of the Divine Feminine in the Hindu Religious Traditions by David Kinsley
Nicholas Kazanas, Vedic Vāc and Greek logos as creative power: a critical study (2009)

Rigvedic deities
Hindu goddesses
Language and mysticism